Matt Riedy is an American actor and voice actor. He was born in Buffalo, New York. He moved to Los Angeles in 2005 and Atlanta in 2019 with his wife.

Career

Riedy has stated that he most often plays "Cops, doctors, lawyers, businesspeople, [and] people in charge".

In 2013, he starred in the slasher film The Den and the following year he starred alongside Robert Downey Jr. in The Judge. He appeared in the two-episode Season 5 finale of Modern Family. In 2016, he played Dr. Mayes in General Hospital until the character was killed off after 10 episodes.

Filmography

Film

Television

Video Games

References

External links 
Matt Riedy on IMDb

Living people
Male actors from Buffalo, New York
American male television actors
People from Buffalo, New York
21st-century American male actors
Year of birth missing (living people)